This is a list of national swimming records for Canada. They are the fastest time ever recorded in each event by a swimmer representing Canada and are ratified by Swimming Canada.

All records were set in finals unless noted otherwise.

Long Course (50 m)

Men

Women

Mixed relay

Short Course (25 m)

Men

Women

Mixed relay

References
General
Canadian Long Course Records – Men 4 March 2023 updated
Canadian Long Course Records – Women 4 March 2023 updated
Canadian Short Course Records – Men 18 December 2022 updated
Canadian Short Course Records – Women 18 December 2022 updated
Specific

External links
Swimming Canada official website
Canadian Records swimrankings.net 4 March 2023 updated

Canadian
Records
Swimming records
Swimming